ISO 11940-2 is an ISO standard for a simplified transcription of the Thai language into Latin characters.

The full standard  includes pronunciation rules and conversion tables of Thai consonants and vowels.

Principle
The standard  (to be renamed ) defines a strict and reversible transliteration of Thai orthography into Latin characters, by means of a host of diacritics. The result bears no resemblance to Thai pronunciation. The additional standard  describes a set of rules to transform the transliteration resulting from  based on Thai orthography into a broad transcription based on pronunciation, using only unadorned Latin letters.

The standard explicitly mentions that whenever the full pronunciation of each word is necessary or needed, conversion of long vowels can be devised and tone rules can be added to the system to achieve the full pronunciation of each word. However no rules are included how to achieve this.

Features
Although the standard is described as a procedure acting on the Thai orthography, the system is based on the pronunciation. Its rules can therefore be also described in terms of Thai phonology. Prominent features of  include:
 uses only unmodified letters from the Latin alphabet; no diacritics
 spells all vowels and diphthongs using only vowel letters: ⟨a⟩, ⟨e⟩, ⟨i⟩, ⟨o⟩, ⟨u⟩
 single letters ⟨a⟩, ⟨e⟩, ⟨i⟩, ⟨o⟩, ⟨u⟩ are simple vowels with the same value as in the International Phonetic Alphabet (IPA)
 digraphs with trailing ⟨e⟩ are simple vowels, ⟨ae⟩, ⟨oe⟩, ⟨ue⟩ sound like  respectively (and are perhaps chosen for their similarity to IPA ligatures)
 digraphs with trailing ⟨a⟩, ⟨i⟩, ⟨o⟩ are diphthongs, indicated by  respectively in IPA
 uses consonants as in IPA, except:
 uses ⟨c⟩ for 
 digraphs with ⟨h⟩ (⟨ph⟩, ⟨th⟩, ⟨kh⟩, ⟨ch⟩) are aspirated consonants, to distinguish them from the separate unaspirated ⟨p⟩, ⟨t⟩, ⟨k⟩, ⟨c⟩
 uses ⟨'⟩ for a glottal stop , as occurs when a syllable starts with a vowel

Transcription is according to pronunciation, not Thai orthography, especially notable in final consonants. Vowels are transcribed in sequence as pronounced, not as written in Thai script. Implied vowels, which are not written in Thai script, are inserted as pronounced. Written silent letters are omitted.

Result
The result of applying the rules described in the standard is almost identical to the transcription defined by the Royal Thai General System of Transcription. One exception is preceding a syllable initial vowel by ⟨'⟩, representing the Thai null consonant อ, obviating the need to insert a dash in some words to preserve syllable boundaries. The other exception is the retention of the aspiration characteristic of the alveolo-palatal affricate. So while Thai ฉ, ช, and ฌ, are represented by ⟨ch⟩ as in RTGS, the Thai letter จ is written as ⟨c⟩.

Details

Consonants

Initials
In each cell below, the first line indicates International Phonetic Alphabet (IPA), the second indicates the Thai characters in initial position (several letters appearing in the same box have identical pronunciation). The third line shows the ISO 11940-2 rendering.

Finals
Of the consonant letters, excluding the obsolete ฃ and ฅ, six (ฉ, ผ, ฝ, ห, อ, ฮ) cannot be used as a final and the other 36 collapse into a very small repertoire of possible final consonant sounds and corresponding Latin letters. The consonants ย and ว when used as finals, form diphthongs and triphthongs with the preceding vowel, and ISO 11940-2 uses the vowel letters i and o in such cases.

Vowels
The basic vowels of the Thai language, from front to back and close to open, are given in the following table. The top entry in every cell is the symbol from the International Phonetic Alphabet, the second entry gives the spelling in the Thai alphabet, where a dash (–) indicates the position of the initial consonant after which the vowel is pronounced. A second dash indicates that a final consonant must follow. The third line contains the ISO 11940 symbol used.

Thai vowels come in long-short pairs, forming distinct phonemes, but ISO 11940-2 represents both by the same symbol. Also the two phonemes IPA  and  share a single Latin letter o.

The basic vowels can be combined into diphthongs and triphthongs.

Notes

External links
ISO 11940-2:2007, Transliteration of Thai characters into Latin characters; part 2: Simplified transcription of Thai language

11940-2
11940-2
Romanization of Thai